David Samuel Goyer (born December 22, 1965) is an American filmmaker, novelist and comic book writer. He is best known for writing the screenplays for several superhero films, including Nick Fury: Agent of S.H.I.E.L.D. (1998), the Blade trilogy (1998–2004), Christopher Nolan's Dark Knight trilogy (2005–2012), Man of Steel (2013) and Batman v Superman: Dawn of Justice (2016). He has also directed four films: Zig Zag (2002), Blade: Trinity (2004), The Invisible (2007) and The Unborn (2009). He is the creator of the science fiction television series Foundation.

Goyer was also co-writer of the video games Call of Duty: Black Ops, Call of Duty: Black Ops II, and Call of Duty: Black Ops Cold War. He won a Saturn Award for Best Writing for Batman Begins (2005) and received another nomination for Dark City, and has been nominated for four Hugo Awards.

Early life
Goyer and his brother Jeff were born in Ann Arbor, Michigan, and were raised by their mother. He is Jewish on his mother's side, and attended Hebrew school. Goyer is an alumnus of Huron High School and the University of Southern California, graduating from the School of Cinema-Television in 1988.

Goyer was a student of screenwriter Nelson Gidding at USC and frequently returned to Gidding's class as a guest speaker. He graduated in 1988 and sold his first screenplay for Death Warrant in 1989, which starred Jean-Claude Van Damme. With his first paycheck, he bought a new Isuzu Trooper, which was stolen the very first night he drove it home.

Career
A professed comic book fanatic who often wrote to letter columns, Goyer has written or co-written several screenplays based on comic book characters and series, including Batman, Superman, Ghost Rider and Blade. Had also written a script treatment for a film adaptation of Venom, which was rejected. Goyer wrote a title based around the Justice Society of America for DC Comics titled JSA, which debuted in August 1999. For the first five issues, he collaborated with James Robinson and, until his departure following issue 51, with Geoff Johns, who would take over as solo writer. Alongside Brannon Braga, Goyer co-created FlashForward, a science-fiction TV series that premiered on ABC in Fall 2009. The series was based on the novel by Robert J. Sawyer. He stepped in as show runner in October 2009 after the series struggled out of the gate. On February 5, 2010, Goyer announced he would be stepping down as FlashForward showrunner to focus on feature films and directing.

Goyer's comic-book films explore the consequences of becoming a symbolic figure, a topic he has long been interested in. In 2011, Goyer wrote a short story titled "The Incident" in which Superman renounces his United States citizenship. Goyer worked with Legendary Pictures on three of their projects. He co-wrote the scripts for The Dark Knight Rises (2012) and Man of Steel (2013). In addition, he did a one-step 4-week rewrite for Legendary Pictures' Godzilla reboot. During the same year, Goyer also published his first novel, Heaven's Shadow, the first in a trilogy co-written by Michael Cassutt for Ace/Penguin. The novel received generally positive reviews. Goyer subsequently sold the film rights to Warner Bros. and is currently adapting the first novel for the big screen.

In late October 2011, cable channel Starz and BBC Worldwide greenlit his TV project, Da Vinci's Demons, which followed the life of a 25-year-old Leonardo da Vinci. "This will be a show about secret histories, genius, madness and all things profane," according to Goyer. The show ran for three seasons and received generally favorable reviews, including an 81% rating from Rotten Tomatoes. In March 2013, The Hollywood Reporter announced that Goyer would be directing a film adaptation of the novel The Count of Monte Cristo by Alexandre Dumas.

In June 2013, he was announced to work on both Justice League and a sequel to Man of Steel. In September 2013, Goyer delivered a screenwriting lecture as part of the BAFTA and BFI Screenwriters' Lecture Series. Goyer-produced the horror film The Forest, directed by Jason Zada. Focus Features has the North American distribution rights to the film, which was Zada's feature film directorial debut.

By 2014, having already earned a reputation as a veteran of the superhero genre, Goyer shifted his focus to the independent production genre, hiring producer Kevin Turen to run his company. Explaining his thinking, Goyer said: "Everybody talks about how it seems like studios increasingly are relying on these big tentpoles and some micro-budget horror films, and that's the majority of the slate," Goyer said. "I've been a benefactor of that movement, but there are a ton of films out there I've really admired over the last few years that studios aren't making, and I wanted to see if I could help get more of them made." In 2015, soon after embracing independent producing, Goyer won a competitive situation to produce the feature version of Miles. Furthermore, he executive-produced Nate Parker's feature Birth of a Nation, which sold for a record $17.5 million at Sundance, before sweeping the festival's awards.

In addition to producing, Goyer continues to write. In 2014, he was tapped to write and produce the feature Fantastic Voyage, based on the 1966 original, for James Cameron. Breaking the news, the Hollywood Reporter announced: "The project has been quiet since 2011, but Goyer's involvement kick-starts and will re-engineer what the studio and producers hope to be an event-sized tentpole. It is also now placing the project on the fast track" In January 2016, acclaimed director Guillermo del Toro signed on to direct the feature. Goyer co-wrote Warner Bros.' blockbuster Batman v Superman: Dawn of Justice (2016), with Zack Snyder and Chris Terrio. In July 2016, it was announced that Goyer will write and direct an upcoming interactive virtual reality film about Darth Vader. Goyer stated that he found creating VR content very different from other media, but said "it's surprising how much you feel and how emotional [the VR experience] is [...] there is stuff that makes you tear up and cry, and it's [sic] really phenomenal."

In January 2017, Goyer signed on to co-produce and co-write Green Lantern Corps, an installment in the DC Extended Universe, with Justin Rhodes, based on a story treatment by Goyer and Geoff Johns. By April of the same year, it was announced that he had signed on to write the script for the reboot of Masters of the Universe, intended to be released in 2019. Goyer was later announced as director along with Lindsey Beer writing a new draft of the screenplay in January 2018. Filming was set to begin April 2018. By February of that year, Goyer dropped out as the film's director and writer. According to Carlos Huante, a creature designer hired for the film and who worked on the original cartoon, Sony felt that Goyer's script would be too expensive to bring to life as Goyer intended for the movie to be on the epic scale of The Lord of the Rings trilogy.

In September 2017, Deadline reported that Goyer and his Green Lantern Corps partner Justin Rhodes, as well as Chris Eglee and Josh Friedman were hired to take part in a writers room in order to write the next Terminator trilogy, under the direction of collaborating team Tim Miller and James Cameron.

In the early 2020s, Goyer produced The Night House, starring Rebecca Hall, as well as the Scott Cooper film Antlers. The Night House premiered at the 2020 Sundance Film Festival; Searchlight purchased the rights to the film, and released it to critical acclaim in August 2021. Goyer also produced the 2021 film The Tomorrow War, starring Chris Pratt for Skydance and Amazon. He has officially been signed on as a producer for the sequel.

Goyer executive produces and serves as showrunner for Foundation, which premiered on Apple TV+ on September 24, 2021, and is based on Isaac Asimov's novels of the same name. He also wrote the first and last episodes as well as directing the season finale. Goyer co-wrote the pilot and serves as executive producer for The Sandman, which was released on Netflix on August 5, 2022. Goyer had been involved with an adaptation of Neil Gaiman's comic book The Sandman since he had pitched a story idea in December 2013. By February 2014, he was set to produce a feature film, starring Joseph Gordon-Levitt, but the film's development stalled and transitioned into a television show.

For the 2022 film Hellraiser, a reimagining of the franchise of the same name, Goyer wrote the story and produced the film under the Phantom Four banner for Spyglass and Hulu. More recently, his Phantom Four company had signed a deal with Village Roadshow Pictures.

Works

Films

Producer only

Uncredited writing roles
 Pet Sematary Two (1992)
 On Deadly Ground (1994)
 Freddy vs. Jason (2003)
 Godzilla (2014)

Television

Video games

Narrative podcasts

Novels
 Heaven's Shadow (with Michael Cassutt) (2011)
 Heaven's War (with Michael Cassutt) (2012)
 Heaven's Fall (with Michael Cassutt) (2013)

References

External links

 
 David Goyer Interview @ PopImage, Oct.01
 David Goyer Interview @ PopImage, Feb 2000
 The Dialogue: An Interview with Screenwriter David Goyer

1965 births
Living people
Skydance Media people
American comics writers
American male screenwriters
Jewish American screenwriters
Writers from Ann Arbor, Michigan
USC School of Cinematic Arts alumni
Film directors from Michigan
Film producers from Michigan
Screenwriters from Michigan
21st-century American Jews
Television producers from Michigan